The 2006 season of the Bhutanese A-Division was the twelfth recorded season of top-flight football in Bhutan. The league was won by Transport United, their third title in a row and only the second time a team had achieved such a hat trick since Druk Pol in 1998.

Transport United qualified for the 2007 AFC President's Cup.

References

Bhutan A-Division seasons
Bhutan
Bhutan
1